The 34th Infantry Regiment (special designation "Leyte Dragons") is a Regular Army infantry regiment of the United States Army. It saw combat in World War I, in the Pacific Theater of Operations in World War II, and was the first full American regiment deployed in combat in the Korean War. The 1st and 3rd Battalions of the 34th are now basic training formations attached to the 165th Infantry Brigade at Fort Jackson, South Carolina.

Other units called "34th Infantry Regiment"
There was a 34th Infantry Regiment in the War of 1812, constituted on 29 January 1813 by enrolling several militia companies from Maine (then Massachusetts) into regular service. This regiment served under General George Izard on the Lake Champlain frontier. In October 1815 it was consolidated into the Regiment of Light Artillery.

At the outbreak of the American Civil War, Congress increased the Regular Army by authorizing the creation of nine new, three-battalion infantry regiments. After the war, the battalions of those regiments were reorganized as separate regiments. The 3rd Battalion, 16th Infantry became the 34th Infantry Regiment on 21 September 1866.  In 1869 Congress reduced the peacetime army from 41 infantry regiments to 25. The 34th and 11th Regiments were consolidated on 6 April to form the current 16th Infantry Regiment.

Origins; World War I; interwar period
The current 34th Infantry Regiment was organized at El Paso, Texas on 15 July 1916, four months into the Punitive Expedition into Mexico led by Major General John J. Pershing. The 34th's original cadre was drawn from the 7th, 20th and 23rd regiments. The regiment was assigned to border patrol and National Guard training duties.

With the American entry into World War I in April 1917 the Army expanded and shifted to preparation for war in Europe. The 34th was assigned to the 7th Division, which arrived in France on 27 August 1918. On 9 October the division went into line in Lorraine with the 34th on its left. It saw action in the Puvenelle sector before the armistice on 11 November. With the rest of the division, the 34th then took up occupation duty in Germany during negotiations of the Treaty of Versailles. The regiment returned to the United States in June 1919.

In the 1920s and 1930s, the 34th Infantry was based at Fort George G. Meade, Maryland, where it served as the Army's first testbed motorized infantry regiment.

On 28 July 1932 regular forces were assembled in Washington, D.C. under the direct command of the Army Chief of Staff, General Douglas MacArthur, to break up the Bonus Army, a protest group largely made up of unemployed World War I veterans seeking pensions from the Herbert Hoover administration. A battalion of the 34th was in reserve while the main action was conducted by the 3rd Cavalry and 12th Infantry.

World War II
On 15 July 1940, following maneuvers in Tennessee in which the 1st Battalion had served as a tank battalion, cadre from the 34th Infantry formed the 70th Tank Battalion, now the 70th Armor Regiment. That same month, the 34th became part of the 8th Infantry Division when that unit was activated at Fort Jackson. The 34th was designated the outstanding regiment of the Carolina Maneuvers of 1941.

In November 1941 the regiment was detached from 8th Division and assigned to the Philippine Department to reinforce the islands, as the prospects of war with Japan increased. The 34th was at San Francisco awaiting embarkation on 7 December when the attack on Pearl Harbor brought the United States into the war. The regiment was reassigned to the Hawaiian Department and its convoy rerouted to Oahu, where it arrived on 21 December. The 34th was put in department reserve and assigned to the defense of the island.

On 12 June 1943 the 34th was assigned to the 24th Infantry Division, replacing the 298th Infantry, a Hawaiian National Guard unit that had been severely depleted the previous year when its ethnic Japanese soldiers were reassigned to the 100th Infantry Battalion (Separate). In September the division shipped out to Australia for training.

The 34th served as division reserve during the Operation Reckless landings at Tanahmerah Bay, Netherlands New Guinea on 22 April 1944. The regiment was brought ashore and assisted in mopping-up operations around the Hollandia airdrome.

In early June the 34th was attached to the 41st Infantry Division, whose assault on Biak Island was meeting unexpected resistance. A two-day assault by the 34th captured Sorido and Brooke airdromes, major objectives in the campaign.

On 16 February 1945 the 3rd Battalion under Col. Aubrey S. "Red" Newman amphibiously assaulted Corregidor and assisted the 503rd Parachute Regimental Combat Team in capturing the island. The fighting lasted until 26 February.

According to Stephen J. Lofgren who prepared the pamphlet, Southern Philippines in the U.S. Army's Center of Military History series The US Army Campaigns of WWII, "The Southern Philippines Campaign usually is given short shrift in popular histories of World War II."  The campaign, which the U.S. Army recognizes as ending on 4 July 1945, actually lasted until Imperial Japanese forces received the news of the Japanese total defeat from Tokyo in September. Operation VICTOR V of the Southern Philippines Campaign was waged with primary objective of eradicating Japanese military power on Mindanao in the Philippine Islands and liberating the Filipino people.

The 34th Infantry, operating as an element of the 24th Infantry Division, participated in some of the most horrific combat under the most insufferable weather and terrain conditions of the War in the Pacific. Yet for the entire campaign U.S. forces losses were minimal. The mopping up activities on the island of Mindanao lasting into September 1945 would result in 22,000 Japanese soldiers emerging from the central Mindanao jungles to surrender.  More than 10,000 Japanese died in combat on Mindanao, while 8,000 or more died from starvation or disease during the campaign. From 17 April to 15 August 1945, 820 U.S. soldiers were killed in eastern Mindanao and 2,880 were wounded; many more deaths and injuries were post 15 August.  The 34th Infantry would go on to occupy the southern Japanese island of Kyushu.

Three 34th Infantry soldiers received the Medal of Honor for service in World War II, all posthumously:
 Captain Francis B. Wai, Leyte, 20 October 1944
 Private Harold H. Moon, Jr., Leyte, 21 October 1944
 Sergeant Charles E. Mower, Capoacan, Leyte, 3 November 1944

Korean War
The first American ground casualty of the Korean War was widely speculated at the time to have been Private Kenneth R. Shadrick of the 34th Infantry Regiment, 24th Infantry Division, who was killed in action on 5 July 1950, three miles south of Osan, Republic of Korea, during the Battle of Osan. Subsequent publications have shed doubt on the accuracy of the claims of Shadrick's distinction; eyewitness accounts at the battle point to the first death actually being a machine gunner in the 21st Infantry Regiment, who had been killed at around 08:30, eight hours before Shadrick's death.

Campaign credits
World War I
 Lorraine
World War II
 New Guinea
 Leyte (with arrowhead)
 Luzon
 Southern Philippines
Korean War
 United Nations Defensive
 United Nations Summer-Fall Offensive
 Korea Summer-Fall 1953

Decorations
 Presidential Unit Citation (Army) for KILAY RIDGE
 Presidential Unit Citation (Army) for CORREGIDOR
 Presidential Unit Citation (Army) for DEFENSE OF KOREA
 Philippine Republic Presidential Unit Citation for 17 OCTOBER 1944 TO 4 JULY 1945
 Republic of Korea Presidential Unit Citation for PYONGTAEK
 Republic of Korea Presidential Unit Citation for KOREA

In Popular Culture

The experience of the 2nd Battalion at the National Training Centre (NTC) in 1982, and the general NTC training experience, are discussed in great detail, but in a very readable fashion, in Daniel Bolger's "Dragons at War."

See also
 Aubrey Newman
 Battle of Corregidor (1945)
 Battle of Leyte
 Battle of Pusan Perimeter
 William F. Dean

Notes

References

 165th Infantry Brigade website

External links
 Prints and Posters: The U.S. Army in Action–"Follow me!"
 Personal account of World War I veteran Hillie John Franz, Hillie John Franz Collection (AFC/2001/001/12617), Veterans History Project, American Folklife Center, Library of Congress.
Corregidor Historical Society website

1916 establishments in Texas
Military units and formations established in 1916
0034
United States Army regiments of World War I
United States Army units and formations in the Korean War